Ernest William Brockton Swanton  (28 June 1870, Dibden – 21 October 1958, Twickenham) was an English mycologist, botanist, conchologist, naturalist, antiquarian, and museum curator. He was the president of the British Mycological Society for the academic year 1915–1916 and the president of the Conchological Society of Great Britain and Ireland in 1921.

Biography
After an early career as a schoolmaster and private tutor, Swanton was appointed in 1897 the curator of the Haslemere Educational Museum. He retired as curator in 1948.

In 1898 Swanton began giving regular series of lessons in natural history to children from the local elementary schools. He illustrated the lessons by handing around specimens from his museum's collections. In 1899 he established a Haslemere Educational Museum Examination for local children after their preparation for several months by studying the museum's galleries.

In 1898 Swanton was one of the founding members of the British Mycological Society. He was known primarily as a field mycologist, although he had a wide range of interests in natural history and antiquarian studies. He wrote several books. His 1909 book Fungi and How to Know Them was a useful and popular handbook and had a 2nd edition in 1922. He edited, with the aid of P. Woods, C.B., the book Bygone Haslemere: A Short History of the Ancient Borough and Its Immediate Neighbourhood from Its Earliest Times (1914, West, Newman & Co.).

On the 27th of September 1916 he gave the British Mycological Society's presidential address, entitled Education in Mycology. In 1920 he was elected an Associate of the Linnean Society of London. He was appointed M.B.E. in 1936 and O.B.E. in 1948. He was granted a Civil List pension in 1949.

He and his wife hosted many forays of the British Mycological Society in the Haslemere district. He frequently acknowledged the help she gave him in museum work. She died in 1957.

His papers and botanical specimens are stored at the Haslemere Educational Museum.

Selected publications

Articles

Books and monographs
  abstract
 
  abstract

References

1870 births
1958 deaths
English mycologists
Conchologists
English antiquarians
English curators
Officers of the Order of the British Empire